Berriasella is a discoidal evolute perisphinctacean ammonite, and type genus for the neocomitid subfamily Berriasellinae.  Its ribbing is distinct, consisting of both simple and bifurcated ribs that extend from the umbilical seam across the venter; its whorl section generally compressed, the venter more or less narrowly rounded. The species Berriasella jacobi traditionally has been regarded an index fossil defining the base of the Cretaceous, however since 2016 this had been replaced by the first occurrence of Calpionella alpina. Some authors regard B. jacobi as instead belonging to the genus Strambergella.

Berriasella, named by Uhlig, 1905, is known from the late Upper Jurassic, Tithonian, to the early Lower Cretaceous, Berriasian and has a fairly worldwide distribution.

Distribution 
Fossils of Berriasella have been found in:
Jurassic
 Latady and Himalia Ridge Formations, Antarctica
 Los Molles Formation, Argentina
 Guasasa Formation, Cuba
 Chia Gara Formation, Iraq
 Muktinath, Nepal
 Punta Moreno Formation, Peru
 Hajar Formation, Yemen

Cretaceous
 President Beaches Formation, Antarctica
 Guchuochun Formation, China
 Buenavista Breccia, Colombia
 Stramberk Formation, Czech Republic
 France
 Szentivánhegy Limestone, Hungary
 Giumal Sandstone, India
 Shal Formation, Iran
 Chia Gara Formation, Iraq
 Carbonera and Taraises Formations, Mexico
 Pieniny Limestone and Rogozno Formation, Poland
 Chigan Formation, Russia
 Tollo and Miravetes Formations, Spain
 Dvuyakornaya Formation, Ukraine
 Hajar Formation, Yemen

References

Further reading 
 

Perisphinctoidea
Ammonitida families
Index fossils
Tithonian first appearances
 
Early Cretaceous genus extinctions
Cretaceous ammonites
Jurassic ammonites
Ammonites of Asia
Cretaceous China
Fossils of China
Fossils of India
Fossils of Iraq
Fossils of Iran
Fossils of Nepal
Fossils of Yemen
Ammonites of Antarctica
Ammonites of Europe
Fossils of the Czech Republic
Cretaceous France
Fossils of France
Fossils of Hungary
Fossils of Poland
Cretaceous Russia
Fossils of Russia
Cretaceous Spain
Fossils of Spain
Fossils of Ukraine
Ammonites of North America
Jurassic Cuba
Fossils of Cuba
Jurassic Mexico
Cretaceous Mexico
Fossils of Mexico
Ammonites of South America
Jurassic Argentina
Cretaceous Argentina
Fossils of Argentina
Cretaceous Colombia
Fossils of Colombia
Jurassic Peru
Fossils of Peru
Fossil taxa described in 1905